Protestants were executed in England under heresy laws during the reigns of Henry VIII (1509–1547) and Mary I (1553–1558). Radical Christians also were executed, though in much smaller numbers, during the reigns of Edward VI (1547–1553), Elizabeth I (1558–1603), and James I (1603–1625). The excesses of this period were recorded in Foxe's Book of Martyrs.

Protestants in England and Wales were executed under legislation that punished anyone judged guilty of heresy against Catholicism. Although the standard penalty for those convicted of treason in England at the time was execution by being hanged, drawn and quartered, this legislation adopted the punishment of burning the condemned. At least 280 people were recognised as burned over the five years of Mary I's reign by contemporary sources.

Historical context

English Reformation
The English Reformation had put a stop to Catholic ecclesiastical governance in England, asserted royal supremacy over the English Church and dissolved some church institutions, such as monasteries and chantries.

An important year in the English Reformation was 1547, when Protestantism became a new force under the child-king Edward VI, England's first Protestant ruler. Edward died at age 15 in 1553. His relative Lady Jane Grey claimed the throne but was deposed by Edward's Catholic half-sister, Mary I.

Persecution of Protestants under Mary I (1553–1558)

The relationship between the English church and Rome was restored at the accession of Queen Mary I to the English throne in 1553. With her repeal of all religious legislation passed under Edward VI, Protestants faced a choice: exile, reconciliation/conversion, or punishment. Many people were exiled, and hundreds of dissenters were burned at the stake, earning her the nickname of "Bloody Mary". The number of people executed for their faith during the persecutions is thought to be at least 287, including 56 women.  Thirty others died in prison.

Although the so-called "Marian Persecutions" began with four clergymen, relics of Edwardian England's Protestantism, Foxe's Book of Martyrs offers an account of the executions, which extended well beyond the anticipated targets – high-level clergy. Tradesmen were also burned, as well as married men and women, sometimes in unison, "youths" and at least one couple was burned alive with their daughter. The figure of 300 victims of the Marian Persecutions was given by Foxe and later by Thomas Brice in his poem, "The Regester".

English Inquisition and the judicial process
However bloody the end, the trials of Protestant heretics were judicial affairs, presided by bishops (most notably Bishop Bonner) adhering to a strict legal protocol under the privy council, with Parliament's blessing. Mary had difficulty forming an efficient Privy Council, which eventually numbered over 40 and never worked as a source of political advice, though it effectively pursued police work and enforcement of religious uniformity. During the session that restored the realm to papal obedience parliament reinstated the heresy laws. From 20 January 1555, England could legally punish those judged guilty of heresy against the Roman Catholic faith.

Thus it became a matter of establishing the guilt or innocence of an accused heretic in open court – a process which the lay authorities employed to reclaim "straying sheep" and to set a precedent for authentic Catholic teaching. If found guilty, the accused were first excommunicated, then handed over to the secular authorities for execution. The official records of the trials are limited to formal accusations, sentences, and so forth; the documents to which historians look for context and detail are those written by the accused or their supporters.

John Rogers' execution
Before Mary's ascent to the throne, John Foxe, one of the few clerics of his day who was against the burning of even obstinate heretics, had approached the Royal Chaplain and Protestant preacher, John Rogers to intervene on behalf of Joan of Kent, a female Anabaptist who was sentenced to burning in 1550. Rogers refused to help, as he supported the burning of heretics. Rogers claimed that the method of execution was "sufficiently mild" for a crime as grave as heresy. Later, after Mary I came to power and restored England to Catholicism, John Rogers spoke quite vehemently against the new order and was burnt as a heretic.

Legacy
Throughout the course of the persecutions, Foxe lists 312 individuals who were burnt or hanged for their faith, or died or sickened in prison. Three of these people are commemorated with a gothic memorial in Oxford, England, but there are many other memorials across England. They are known locally as the "Marian Martyrs".

English Saints and Martyrs of the Reformation Era are remembered in the Church of England with a Lesser Festival on 4 May.

Martyrs executed

Also mentioned by Foxe
John Fortune (or Cutler) (of Hintlesham, Suffolk, blacksmith, either burnt or died in prison) 
 John Warner of Bourne
 Thomas Athoth, priest 'he may have died in prison, escaped or – less likely – been pardoned.'
 John Ashedon of Catsfield

Posthumous proceedings
 William Tracy of Toddington, Gloucestershire, 'worshipful esquire', exhumed and burnt, 1532 
 John Tooley, poulterer, exhumed and burnt, 4 June 1555 
 James Trevisam, died 3 July 1555 and summoned posthumously to appear before the bishop
 Catherine, wife of Peter Martyr Vermigli, exhumed 1556, Cambridge
 Martin Bucer, Professor of Divinity, exhumed and burnt 6 February 1557, Cambridge
 Paul Fagius, Lecturer in Hebrew, exhumed and burnt 6 February 1557, Cambridge
 Joan Seaman, early 1558, refused burial at Mendlesham
 John Glover, gentleman, 'about the latter end of Queen Mary', ordered to be exhumed
 William Glover, September 1558, refused burial at Wem, Shropshire
 Edward Burton, 15 January 1559, refused burial at Shrewsbury

Those who sickened or died in prison

See also

Marian exiles
Martyrs' Memorial
Foxe's Book of Martyrs
Religion in the United Kingdom
Oxford Martyrs
List of people executed in Smithfield
Coventry Martyrs
Martyrs Mirror, a book with a similar theme dealing with primarily with Anabaptist martyrs
Short, sharp shock

Notes

References

External links 
List of martyrs according to Foxe
List of martyrs according to Summers

Lists of Christian martyrs
English Reformation
Marian martyr
Mary I of England
Religiously motivated violence in England
Human rights abuses in England
Political and cultural purges
 
Anglican saints